Mr. Majestyk is a 1974 American action film directed by Richard Fleischer and written by Elmore Leonard. Charles Bronson stars as the title character, a melon farmer and Vietnam War veteran who comes into conflict with gangsters. Leonard, who wrote the film with an original screenplay, took the name Majestyk from a character in his 1969 crime novel The Big Bounce. He would also write the novelization of the film.

Plot
Vince Majestyk (Charles Bronson) is a farmer, an ex-con, a former U.S. Army Ranger instructor and Vietnam War veteran, who owns and operates a watermelon farm in rural Colorado. He needs to harvest his crop soon in order to keep the farm financially solvent.

A small-time hood, Bobby Kopas (Paul Koslo), attempts to coerce Majestyk into a protection racket of using unskilled drunks to harvest his watermelon crop. Majestyk runs him off with Kopas' own shotgun and hires experienced Mexican migrant workers, including Nancy Chavez (Linda Cristal), a crop picker who is also a union leader. Kopas brings assault charges against Majestyk, resulting in the farmer being placed under arrest before he can finish the harvest.

In jail, Majestyk meets and annoys Frank Renda (Al Lettieri), a notorious mob hit man being transferred to a higher-security prison. Renda's men try to break him out of police custody during a prisoner transport by bus. In the escape attempt, Majestyk drives off in the bus with Renda still in handcuffs, eventually taking him to his hunting cabin in the nearby foothills. Majestyk hopes to trade Renda to the police in return for being released to finish harvesting his melons. Renda offers his captor $25,000 for his freedom, but Majestyk declines. Renda then threatens to kill Majestyk if he doesn't release him, and Majestyk pretends to be persuaded to take the money, but contacts both the police and Renda's mafia contacts to come pick them up.

Wiley (Lee Purcell), Renda's girlfriend, arrives and they manage to turn the tables on Majestyk, although he is able to escape. Renda learns the charges for which he had been imprisoned have been dropped. He meets up with his right-hand man, Lundy (Taylor Lacher), who advises him to fly to Mexico and enjoy himself; Renda will have none of it as he wants revenge on Majestyk. He arranges for Kopas to drop the assault charges against Majestyk, and orders his men to find the "melon picker" so he can have the satisfaction of killing him personally.

They arrive at the farm to kill Majestyk, but not finding him they instead machine-gun the melons and rough up the hired hands, forcing them to depart. That same night, as Majestyk and Nancy have a drink at a bar in town Renda approaches and tells him he plans to kill him. Instead of being intimidated, Majestyk knocks Renda down, telling him to "call the cops", further infuriating Renda. The next day, Kopas badly injures Majestyk's foreman Larry Mendoza (Alejandro Rey), as he tries to deliver a load of melons, putting him in hospital.

Renda and his men surround Majestyk's home, but Majestyk gets away in the back of a pickup truck driven by Nancy, and a prolonged car chase ensues.  The police set up roadblocks and launch a helicopter hoping to find them.  Luring Renda and his men into the foothills, Majestyk turns the tables on them and becomes the attacker, killing most of Renda's men during the pursuit. Realizing they are now the hunted, Renda retreats to their lodge hideout where he, Wiley, Lundy and Kopas hole up.  Renda sends Wiley outside to negotiate with Majestyk, hoping to force him to show himself, but Majestyk sends her away with Nancy. After removing the keys from their vehicle, Majestyk then assaults the cabin, killing Lundy after Renda sacrifices him to save himself.  Disgusted, Kopas decides to leave when he realizes Renda will also sacrifice him to get to Majestyk. With Kopas' help, Majestyk gets the drop on Renda and kills him. The police soon arrive and arrest Kopas and Wiley, while Majestyk drives off with Nancy.

Cast

 Charles Bronson as Vincent "Vince" Majestyk
 Al Lettieri as Frank Renda
 Linda Cristal as Nancy Chavez
 Lee Purcell as Wiley
 Paul Koslo as Bobby Kopas
 Taylor Lacher as Gene Lundy
 Frank Maxwell as Sheriff Detective Lieutenant John "Johnny" McAllen
 Alejandro Rey as Larry Mendoza

Production

Filming
The movie was filmed on location in La Junta, Colorado, Canon City, Colorado, Rocky Ford, Colorado, and Manzanola, Colorado.

One of the series of tunnels used in the production: https://www.flickr.com/photos/mobili/44123978700/

https://www.flickr.com/photos/mobili/44123978700/in/photolist-2ae5VBs-DJiLTC-qEknDj-81ASUK-brksJa-5Dfw2A-6hFXMM-duzDMK-duzDDg-duFeKd-duFfz9-9vQmRM-8edm2S-7NqUsB-4EcKQi-PxGYm-8AVeXX-e4ZMVt-njUMa-JammU8-JajTuw-JamAFM-K6LsAD-K6LoFK-JETcMb-FnNUwG-JETaio-JajUtq-JYPQFn-JYPPKe-KVy44L-JETbLJ-JYPRoV-6GqoQn

Release

Marketing
The Ford Motor Company used scenes licensed from the movie showing extreme driving of Majestyk's 1968 Ford F-100 pickup truck during commercials for its 1976 Ford trucks.

Home Media
The film was first released to DVD in 2003 by MGM/UA on a dual-sided disc that contained both the Widescreen and Standard versions. On the back cover there is a picture of Bronson holding a shotgun with a cigarette in his mouth. Although Bronson smoked in real life, his character in the movie did not, indicating that this may be an outtake or publicity still. The picture is missing from the back covers of Kino Lorber's Blu-ray releases in 2014 and 2021.

Reception

Critical response
The movie was popular with Bronson action film enthusiasts. Howard Thompson of The New York Times said, "Except for some dutiful splattering of gore, it ticks along rather steadily, under Richard Fleischer's unruffled direction. There is a take-it-or-leave-it air that snugly suits the star's performance, or vice versa." The scene in which Nancy and Majestyk drive away in a pickup truck with Renda's men in hot pursuit became one of the most famous chase sequences of the period, following the recent trend of those in Bullitt (1968) and The French Connection (1971).

On Rotten Tomatoes the film holds an 82% rating based on 17 reviews.

See also
 List of American films of 1974

References

Sources
 'Elmore Leonard Week: Elmore on Clint Eastwood, Bruce Willis, and William Friedkin', Contrappasso Magazine (Contrappasso #2, December 2012)

External links
 
 
 
 

1974 films
1974 action films
American action films
Films based on works by Elmore Leonard
Films with screenplays by Elmore Leonard
Films directed by Richard Fleischer
Films produced by Walter Mirisch
Films scored by Charles Bernstein
United Artists films
1970s English-language films
1970s American films